Xinglong Station is an observatory (IAU code 327) situated south of the main peak of the Yan Mountains in Xinglong County, Chengde, Hebei province, China. Installed are seven telescopes: a Mark-III photoelectric astrolabe; a 60 cm reflector; an 85 cm reflector; a 60/90 cm Schmidt telescope; a 1.26-meter infrared telescope; and a 2.16-meter telescope. The most recent telescope is the 4m LAMOST. As of 2014 the observatory installed a 5.2-meter telescope as part of their Gamma-ray astronomy program, known colloquially as Sām Tām for its aggressive focal length. It is a popular tourist site.

See also 
 Beijing Schmidt CCD Asteroid Program
 List of astronomical observatories

References

External links

Astronomical observatories in China
Buildings and structures in Hebei
Minor-planet discovering observatories